Arica is a commune and a port city with a population of 222,619 in the Arica Province of northern Chile's Arica y Parinacota Region. The city is the capital of both the Arica Province and the Arica and Parinacota Region. Arica is located at the bend of South America's western coast known as the Arica Bend or Arica Elbow. At the location of the city are two valleys that dissect the Atacama Desert converge: Azapa and Lluta. These valleys provide citrus and olives for export.

Arica is an important port for a large inland region of South America. The city serves a free port for Bolivia and manages a substantial part of that country's trade. In addition it is the end station of the Bolivian oil pipeline beginning in Oruro. The city's strategic position is enhanced by being next to the Pan-American Highway, being connected to both Tacna in Peru and La Paz in Bolivia by railroad and being served by an international airport.

Its mild weather has made Arica known as the "city of the eternal spring" in Chile while its beaches are frequented by Bolivian society. The city was an important port already during Spanish colonial rule. Chile seized the city from Peru in 1880 during the War of the Pacific, being recognized as Chilean by Peru in 1929. A substantial part of African Chileans live in or trace their origins to Arica.

History
Archaeological findings indicate that Arica was inhabited by different native groups dating back 10,000 years. These people are the first known culture to mummify their dead, predating the Egyptians by 2,000 years, and their mummies have been discovered as recently as 2004 and buried as shallow as <1 meter beneath the city's surface.

Colonial period
Spaniards settled the land under captain Lucas Martinez de Begazo in 1541, and in 1570, the area was grandly retitled as "La Muy Ilustre y Real Ciudad San Marcos de Arica" (the very illustrious and royal city of San Marcos of Arica). By 1545, Arica was the main export entrepot for Bolivian silver coming down from Potosí, which then possessed the world's largest silver mine. Arica thus held a crucial role as one of the leading ports of the Spanish Empire. These enviable riches made Arica the target for pirates, buccaneers, and privateers, among whom Francis Drake, Thomas Cavendish, Richard Hawkins, Joris van Spilbergen, John Watling, Baltazar de Cordes, Bartholomew Sharp, William Dampier, and John Clipperton all took part in looting the city.

Peruvian period (1821–1880)
Following the collapse of Spanish rule, in 1821, Arica was part of the recently independent Peruvian Republic. The Peruvian Constitution of 1823 regards it as a province of the Department of Arequipa. In 1855, Peru inaugurated the Arica-Tacna railroad (53 km long), one of the first in Latin America. The rail line still functions today.

The earthquake of August 13, 1868 struck near the city with an estimated magnitude of 8.0 to 9.0 Estimates on the death toll vary greatly, some estimates have the number at 25,000 to 70,000 people. Others estimate that the population of Arica was less than 3,000 people and the death toll was around 300. It triggered a tsunami, measurable across the Pacific in Hawaii, Japan and New Zealand. As Arica lies very close to the subduction zone known as the Peru–Chile Trench where the Nazca Plate dives beneath the South American Plate, the city is subject to megathrust earthquakes.

Chilenization period (1880–1929)

Chilean forces occupied the region following the War of the Pacific. The Treaty of Ancón in 1883 formally acceded the region to Chilean control. The 1929 Tacna-Arica compromise in the Treaty of Lima subsequently restored Tacna to Peru but Arica remained part of Chile.

Modern Arica (1929–present)
In 1958, the Chilean Government established the "Junta de Adelanto de Arica" (Board of Development for Arica), which promulgated many tax incentives for the establishment of industries, such as vehicle assembly plants, a tax-free zone, and a casino, among others.
Many car manufacturers opened plants in Arica, such as Citroën, Peugeot, Volvo, Ford and General Motors, which produced the Chevrolet LUV pickup until 2008.

In 1975, together with Chile's new open economy policies, the "Junta de Adelanto de Arica" was abolished.

The Arica and Parinacota Region was created on October 8, 2007, under Law 20.175, promulgated on March 23, 2007, by President Michelle Bachelet in the city of Arica.

Swedish Toxic waste dumpsite
In 2021, UN human rights experts said they were deeply concerned by the continuous devastating impact on Arica of a dumping of toxic waste by a Swedish company nearly 40 years ago. In 1984–1985, Swedish company Boliden Mineral AB dumped nearly 20,000 tonnes of toxic waste, containing high concentrations of arsenic, mercury, cadmium and lead, outside of Arica. Boliden paid a local company, Promel Ltda., the equivalent of $1.2 million ($3.15 million in 2021 dollars) to receive, treat and confine the waste. The toxic waste - which remains outdoors, uncovered and exposed to nature's elements - poses a health and security risk including to drinking water systems, given its high content of arsenic. In 2013, 796 Arica residents, including human rights defenders, started legal action in Sweden against Boliden. The Court of Appeal for Northern Norrland held that the claims of the victims were time limited, and the Swedish Supreme Court declined to hear the case.

Demography

The population grew by 20% (37,351 people) between the 2002 and 2017 censuses. Arica is home to 97.7% of the total population of the region.

The population of Arica is made up of various long-established groups in the region, and other more recent arrivals settled at differing times. Among the long-established groups, the oldest consists of indigenous Amerindians, such as the Aymara, whose presence in the region is of several millennia. These are followed by the second oldest, the local colonial-era groups, which includes local mestizos (of mixed Spanish-Amerindian origin), local criollos (whites of colonial Spanish origin), and local afrodescendants of colonial-era slaves. The third oldest group consists of early post-colonial Chinese Chileans who first arrived as miners and rail workers in the 1890s.

These long-established groups of Ariqueños have been augmented by various later settlers, mostly other criollos and mestizo Chileans from elsewhere around Chile, but also numerous Europeans, who arrived in the 1900s, including more Spaniards arriving from Spain, as well as Italians, Greeks, British, and French. These arrived at different times during the last century.

Some Ariqueños, primarily the indigenous Amerindians, but also the afro-descendants, share cultural affinities to counterpart populations in neighbouring border areas of Peru, and more distantly, Bolivia.

The urban area of Arica has 175,441 inhabitants in an area of 41.89 km2. Arica in 2007 had more than 185,000 inhabitants (not counting the inhabitants of the valleys and Lluta Azapa, with that reach almost to the 194.000 inhabitants). The growing city of Arica spreads outward into the desert and the Peru-Chile border. The Azapa Valley has developed a year-round agricultural economy due to improvements in irrigation and transportation of its products.

The villages that make up the commune are Villa Frontera and San Miguel de Azapa. Some hamlets are Poconchile, Molinas, Sora, Las Maitas and Caleta Vitor.

Arica was made famous in 1970 by the spiritual master Oscar Ichazo when he held a 10-month training there for 50 North Americans from the Esalen Institute in California.  The Arica School, based in the United States of America, has influenced thousands of people all over the world.

The commune of Arica is composed of 19 census districts.

Source: INE 2007 report, "Territorial division of Chile"

Notable residents
 Jean-François Dauxion-Lavaysse, a Frenchman, born in 1770 or 1775, died on 8 July 1829 in Arica. He was the first director of the Chilean National Museum of Natural History and the Botanical Garden.
 Dante Poli – former footballer
 Hipólito Unanue – physician, and briefly President of Peru
Izkia Siches, Vice president and minister of the interior of Chile.
 Américo – singer
 Chañaral Ortega-Miranda (b. 1973) – classical composer

Economics 
Arica is the economical powerhouse of its region. It is an enormous trade and shipping point and vital for the maritimal access of Bolivia.

Features

The Morro de Arica is a steep and tall hill located in the city. Its height is 139 meters above sea level. It was the last bulwark of defence for the Peruvian troops who garrisoned the city. It was assaulted and captured on June 7, 1880, by Chilean troops in the last part of their Campaña del Desierto (Desert Campaign) during the War of the Pacific.

Near the city is the Azapa Valley, an oasis where vegetables and Azapa olives are grown. Economically, it is an important port for Chilean ore, and its tropical latitude, dry climate, and the city's beach, have made Arica a popular tourist destination. It is also a center of rail communication with Bolivia and has its own international airport. Arica has strong ties with the city of Tacna, Peru; many people cross the border daily to travel between the cities, partly because many services (for example, dentists) are cheaper on the Peruvian side. Arica is connected to Tacna in Peru and to La Paz in Bolivia by separate railroad lines.

Climate

According to the Köppen Climate Classification system, Arica has a hot desert climate, abbreviated "BWh" on climate maps. Unlike many other cities with arid climates, Arica seldom sees extreme temperatures throughout the course of the year and it is also relatively overcast. Arica is also known as the driest inhabited place on Earth, at least as measured by rainfall: average annual precipitation is 0.76 mm (0.03 inches), as measured at the airport meteorological station.

Administration
As a commune, Arica is a third-level administrative division of Chile administered by a municipal council, headed by an alcalde who is directly elected every four years. The 2008–2012 alcalde is Waldo Sankán Martínez (Independent).

Within the electoral divisions of Chile, Arica is represented in the Chamber of Deputies by Mr. Vlado Mirosevic (Partido Liberal) and Mr. Luis Rocaful as part of the 1st electoral district, which includes the entire Arica and Parinacota Region. The commune is represented in the Senate by José Miguel Insulza (PS, 2018–2026) and José Durana (UDI, 2018–2026) as part of the 1st senatorial constituency (Arica and Parinacota Region and Tarapacá Region).

Sports
Arica was one of the four host cities of the 1962 FIFA World Cup, and it was the venue for a Rip Curl Pro Search surfing event that took place from June 20 to July 1, 2007.
Arica plays host to a leg of the International Bodyboarding Association's world tour event every year at the notorious "el flops" surf break. The event has been running since 2004.

Tourist attractions
Morro de Arica: the prominent mount rising above the city, affording sweeping views.
Catedral de San Marcos de Arica: the magnificent church designed by Gustave Eiffel was built in the 1870s. 
Plaza Colón: the civic heart of the city, the public square is where its residents congregate for celebrations, diversions or just being a part of the community.

Other attractions include the former house of the Governor, the Former Arica Custom House, railway station Arica-La Paz, the Archaeological and Anthropological Museum of San Miguel de Azapa, Sea and Historical Arms and Arica. For evening entertainment there is the Casino de Arica.

Beaches
More than 20 km of beaches, many known for the quality of surfing, span across the Coastal Range in the northern sector. The harbored location makes these beaches unique from other cities in Chile in terms of topography.

From north to south the beaches are located Las Machas, Chinchorro, del Alacrán, El Laucho, La Lisera, Brava, Arenillas Negras, La Capilla, Corazones and La Liserilla.

Other tourist sites

Chungará Lake: Arica is the main access road to the lake, the 29th highest in the world (and the 10th highest in South America), with an approximate height of 4517 metres. It is located within the Lauca National Park.
Pucará de Copaquilla: about 3,000 metres above sea level, dates from the 12th century, declared National Monument, located on a promontory that serves as the defence has a double stone wall, which protects a series of internal spaces. From this point it is possible to observe the pre-and streams.
Termas de Jurasi a few miles southeast of Putre, by Ruta 11-CH, turning off a dirt road. Underground waters are home to temperatures above  which are reputed to have medicinal properties.
Surf Arica is a world-famous spot for surfing. The wave known as "El Gringo" hosts surfing and bodyboarding world championships every year. In 2007, Arica was the site for an ASP world tour contest. Others stops on this tour include Hawaii, Tahiti, Fiji and South Africa.

Transport 

Passenger train services on the Arica–La Paz railway ceased in 1996, but as of 2017 there were proposals to restart services from Arica as a tourist attraction (and for freight).

In 2011, Chile announced plans to privatise the Port of Arica. These were opposed by Bolivia, as Arica is its main sea port.

Chacalluta International Airport is the main airport in Arica and is located 18.5 km north of the city. LATAM Chile, Amaszonas, JetSmart, and Sky Airline have scheduled commercial service to several Chilean airports.

References

External links

 Portal informativo de la Region de Arica y Parinacota
 Portal Turistico de la Region de Arica y Parinacota
 Portal de panoramas y carretes de la Region de Arica y Parinacota
 Municipality of Arica 
Arica weather
Arica Tours to Parque Nacional Lauca and Atacama 
New York Times article about the 1868 earthquake
Arica-Chile in a nutshell

 
Capitals of Chilean regions
Capitals of Chilean provinces
Communes of Chile
Populated places in Arica Province
Port cities in Chile
Populated places established in 1541
Atacama Desert
War of the Pacific
Weather extremes of Earth
1541 establishments in the Spanish Empire
Coasts of Arica y Parinacota Region